The Apolinario Mabini Hiking Society, later popularly known as APO Hiking Society, or simply APO, were a Filipino musical group, that comprised Danny Javier, Jim Paredes, and Boboy Garrovillo. They are regarded as one of the pillars and icons of Original Pilipino Music (OPM). The group was formed and had its fledgling beginnings in 1969 at the Ateneo de Manila High School, with 15 members: John Paul Micayabas, Lito de Joya, Sonny Santiago, Gus Cosio, Renato Garcia, Chito Kintanar, Kenny Barton, Bruce Brown, Butch Dans, Kinjo Sawada, Ric Segreto Macaraeg, Goff Macaraeg, Doden Besa, Jim Paredes, Boboy Garrovillo, and the 16th member, Danny Javier, who joined in college. The group's name was created from the acronym AMHS representing their school with a witty twist having an irreverent reference to the  Philippine revolutionary intellectual and hero, Apolinario Mabini, and later shortened to "Apo", an Ilocano term for a wise man or a Tagalog term of grandchildren, and later re-branded to "APO" (all caps). Contrary to popular belief, the "Apo" name was not a reference to the Philippines's highest peak, the potentially-active stratovolcano Mount Apo.

As the students advanced into college, their lead vocalist Danny Javier joined the group. After graduation, the majority of its members left to pursue individual careers, with only three members remaining, made up of Danny Javier, Jim Paredes, and Boboy Garovillo.

In the span of their professional career, APO emerged as a principal adherent of the musical movement termed Original Pilipino Music (OPM), a term coined by Danny Javier, a milieu in which their original musical contributions and cultural influence became essential. APO became involved in record production, talent management and organizing artists under the Organisasyon ng Pilipinong Mang-aawit (O.P.M., acronym translation: "Organization of Philippine Singers/musicians"). The group expanded its activities into establishing and furthering the careers of new OPM artists in the Philippines.

To date, the group has released 27 albums in four decades of its career. Two hugely successful tribute albums were produced in 2006 and 2007 by its management group, featuring numerous young bands reinterpreting APO's expansive repertoire.

The group frequently utilized their brand name, "APO", as a clever component for Tagalog puns in titles for television shows such as their own noon-time variety shows, Sa Linggo nAPO Sila and 'Sang Linggo nAPO Sila, live programs and marketing materials, for example, as in nA PO, which transliterates as "already" (polite/formal usage)

In 2010, Danny, Jim, and Boboy retired the group's name after 41 years of performing. They performed a series of concerts from February to May. They are also reunited for the last time to perform in the Inauguration of Benigno Aquino III on June 30, 2010. After APO retired from singing with the departure of Danny, Jim and Boboy still remained active in show business and still performing occasionally as a duo. In 2022, The APO Hiking Society lost one of its members upon the death of the lead singer Danny Javier, due to a prolonged illness at the National Kidney and Transplant Institute on October 31, 2022, at the age of 75, as confirmed by his daughter Justine.

Members
 Danny Javier - lead vocals, composer
 Jim Paredes - vocals, composer
 Boboy Garrovillo - vocals, composer

History

The name "Apolinario Mabini Hiking Society" was meant to be deliberately ironic since the historical figure, Apolinario Mabini, famously lost the use of his legs to polio.

The APO Hiking Society first gained recognition in 1973 when they gave a farewell concert at the Meralco Theater in Pasig, Metro Manila, Philippines. Just out of college, the group was the talk of the Ateneo de Manila University and adjoining campuses for their music and humor.

It was only when two of its four members were about to retire from the field of amateur music, however, that APO Hiking Society, then known as the Apolinario Mabini Hiking Society, finally had a citywide audience. One of them was scheduled to leave for Turkey as an exchange student. The other had a position waiting for him in his father's advertising firm.

The trip to Turkey did not materialize and APO, now a tentative trio, pushed on steadily towards fame and fortune.

In late 1978, APO Hiking Society nearly disbanded after Jim Paredes stormed out of a songwriting session. While asking Danny Javier for a 3 syllable word to fill in a line, he was provided the word "katapusan"; a four syllable word. The error went unnoticed until post-recording, where an irate Paredes noticed that the word had indeed one extra syllable more than what he had originally intended.

Looking back, APO members Danny Javier and Boboy Garrovillo do not regret never having been regular wage earners. Their farewell concert, which had SRO audiences for two stormy nights, not unexpectedly became a hit record the following year.

Achievements
In the three decades since that "farewell" concert, APO has made 22 record albums; hosted several television shows, including their own noontime Sunday show "Sa Linggo nAPO Sila" and noontime show from Monday to Saturday "'Sang Linggo nAPO Sila"; and launched hugely successful major solo concerts and countless provincial, dinner, and corporate shows. They have performed in over 50 cities in the United States, Canada, Singapore, Indonesia, Germany, Switzerland, Italy, and Japan to bring Original Pilipino Music to Filipinos.

In 1978, APO won 2nd Place winner in the Metro Manila Popular Song Festival (now MetroPop Song Festival from 1996 to 2003) for their runner-up song Ewan. The song was composed by Louie Ocampo.

In October 1987, during their annual US tour, APO became the first Filipino pop artists with Marco Sison to perform at the Main Hall of New York's prestigious Carnegie Hall. They also performed at the equally prestigious Massey Hall in Toronto, Canada's music capital. Both concerts and the other shows held during that particular concert tour were sold out. APO were also the first Filipino artists to perform in a public concert in Saudi Arabia. In 1987, they were one of the first Filipino artists to be recorded on compact disc. And in 1994, they were awarded the first Dangal ng Musikang Pilipino by Awit Awards - the Filipino equivalent of the Grammy. They have also been conferred the Tanglaw Ng Lahi Award, the highest accolade given by Jesuits in the field of culture and arts.

APO also earned international recognition for "Handog ng Pilipino sa Mundo" was recorded by 15 Filipino artists in April 1986. A few months later, the English version "A New and Better Way" was launched in Australia. In February 1987, the first anniversary of the Philippines' People Power revolution, the song was released in London, England. The song's lyrics are embedded on Our Lady of Edsa Shrine's wall, the center of the revolution.

In 1998, APO and the now-defunct band Eraserheads teamed up for their first "San Miguel Beer" TV commercial, "Homeboys." The concept of reviving and modernizing their originals by rock/alternative bands in the 1990s paved the way to two tribute albums by various bands entitled Kami nAPO Muna in 2006 and Kami nAPO Muna Ulit in 2007.

In 1999, APO was also a finalist at MetroPop Song Festival for their song finalist Dito Sa Kanto. The song was composed by Noel Cabangon, then Cabangon covered his version in 1999, then re-recorded a duet with Parokya Ni Edgar vocalist Chito Miranda in 2013 again.

In 2007, Jacee with the group was awarded as "MYX Magna Award 2007" in the MYX Music Awards 2007, achieving the best OPM pop music and his music and recording achievements in OPM history.

In 2009, APO was inducted to the Philippines Eastwood City Walk of Fame, contributing their singing, hosting, and acting skills.

APO Tribute albums
Just a few years after their hiatus, the tribute album Kami nAPO Muna was released in honor of the group. The Filipino musical artists who did their own unique renditions of APO songs includes: Imago, Orange and Lemons, Parokya ni Edgar, Kamikazee, Sandwich, Sugarfree, Itchyworms, Sponge Cola, Boldstar, Sound, Drip, Rocksteddy, Top Suzara, Barbie Almalbis, Kitchie Nadal, Shamrock, and The Dawn. Their second volume, Kami nAPO muna Ulit has also included their new members in the compilation album are True Faith, Silent Sanctuary, Concrete Sam, Up Dharma Down, Chilitees, The Bloomfields, Scrambled Eggs, The Spaceflower Show, and Hilera.

Acoustic balladeer Noel Cabangon also had a new tribute album to the Pinoy pop musical group, Throwback: Ang Songbook Ng APO. Released in 2014 through Universal Records, it features his cover versions of popular various APO songs.

2008–2009 reunion
On September 20, 2008, APO Hiking Society had a reunion concert called "Apo of the Philippines" which was held at the Araneta Coliseum to celebrate their 39th Anniversary. They sang all of the APO favorites and all songs from their past releases.

On February 7, 2009, APO performed in the Open Air FTI Complex in Taguig. The free concert was sponsored in cooperation with Taguig City Hall. One month later, the Eraserheads had their Final Set Concert.

On November 17, 2009, APO Hiking Society marked their 40th anniversary with a big concert at the SM North EDSA Skydome. It was called "APO Kayang-Kaya Pa". This was originally scheduled on September 26 but was rescheduled due to the Typhoon "Ondoy" ("Ketsana").

2010 retirement

Last December 16, 2009, APO Hiking Society announced that they are already retiring as a group due to the "diminishing creative process." They performed a series of shows that started on February 14, 2010, and ended in May, just in time for the elections. They also reunited for the last time to perform in the Inauguration of President Benigno 'Noynoy' Aquino III last June 30, 2010.

Post-APO Hiking Society

After APO retired from singing with the departure of the lead singer Danny Javier, its members remained active in show business and are still performing:

Jim Paredes is still active in singing and is also a photography hobbyist. He is also a political activist.

Boboy Garovillo now has a career acting in both movie and television.

Danny Javier created the Pidro: Ang Saplot Ng Bayan T-shirt line that would be chosen as the official shirt of the Philippine Centennial celebrations in 1998. He starred in Bangis on TV5 in 2010 and appeared in Season 3 of ASOP: A Song Of Praise Music Festival in 2014 as a guest judge. Javier later retired from both singing and acting. He died on October 31, 2022, due to his lingering illness.

Musical film
In 2012, a movie musical based on APO songs was released.  Titled I Doo Bidoobidoo, it was released on August 29.  The film was inspired by Mamma Mia, a musical that was based on and used ABBA songs, which later became a movie.

Discography

Studio albums
 Collector's Item (1975)
 Songwriter (1976)
 Pagkatapos ng Palabas (1978)
 Ten Years Together (1980)
 Twelve Years Together (1982)
 True To My Music (1983)
 Feet On The Ground (1984)
 Made in the Philippines (1985)
 Direksyon (1987)
 Mga Kuwento ng Apo (1988)
 Songbuk ng APO (1991)
 PaskonAPO (1991)
 1-2-3 (1992)
 Barangay Apo (1993)
 Dating Alternatib (1996)
 Mismo! (1999)
 Banda Rito (2001)
 PaskonAPO Repackaged (Repackaged & Digitally Remastered 2006)
 The Apo: Jim, Buboy and Danny (Their 26th APO Album after 8 years, 2009)

Live albums
 In Concert#$%!? (Live Album) (1974)
 The Worst of Apo Hiking Society (Live Album) (1986)
 DalawampunAPOsila (Live Album) (1989)

Compilations
 The Best of Apo Hiking Society, Vol. 1 (1982)
 The Best of Apo Hiking Society, Vol. 2 (1991)
 Kami nAPO muna: 2-Disc Limited Edition (2006)
 Kami nAPO muna ulit: 2-Disc Limited Edition (2007)
 The Best Of Kami nAPO Muna 2-CD (2008)
 APO Hiking Society: 18 Greatest Hits (2009)
 Kami nAPO Naman Dito Sa Canada Limited Edition (2009)

Collaborations
 The 2nd Metro Manila Pop Music Fest Album (Vicor Music Corp., 1978)
 Pamasko Ng Mga Bituin (Universal Records, 1981)
 Salubungin Ang Pasko (Universal Records, 1986)
 Handog Ng Pilipino Sa Mundo (Universal Records, 1986)
 Ginintuang Diwa ng Pasko (Universal Records, 1989)
 18 Classic OPM Love Songs (PolyEast Records, 1995)
 Sandaan 1898-1998 (Universal Records, 1998)
 6th Metropop Song Festival The Album (GMA Records, 2001)
 The Love Song Collection (Universal Records, 2003)
 Only Selfless Love (Universal Records, 2003)
 OPM Gold (Universal Records, 2005)
 OPM Superstars Christmas (Universal Records, 2005)
 The Best of OPM Love Ballads (Universal Records, 2005)
 The Best of OPM Novelty Hits (Universal Records, 2005)
 OPM Gold Christmas Album (Universal Records, 2006)
 OPM Platinum Christmas (Universal Records, 2007)
 Bongga! The Biggest OPM Retro Hits Of The Year (Universal Records, 2008)
 No. 1 Signature Hits OPM's Best (Vicor Music Corp., 2008)
 Senti 18 Pinoy Love Hits (Vicor Music Corp. & Viva Records, Corp., 2008)
 Pinoy Sound Trip Vol. 1 (Vicor Music Corp. & Viva Records, Corp., 2008)
 Pinoy Sound Trip Vol. 2 (Vicor Music Corp. & Viva Records, Corp., 2008)
 Bongga 2: Another Biggest OPM Retro Hits (Universal Records, 2009)
 Love Knows No Boundaries (Vicor Music Corp. & Viva Records, Corp., 2009)
 No. 1 Signature Hits OPM's Best Vol. 2 (Vicor Music Corp. & Viva Records Corp., 2009)
 Paalam, Maraming Salamat Pres. Aquino: A Memorial Tribute Soundtrack (Star Music, 2009)
 The Best Of Manila Sound Vol. 1 (Vicor Music Corp., 2010)
 The Best Of Manila Sound Vol. 2 (Vicor Music Corp., 2010)
 OPM All-Star Christmas (Universal Records, 2010)

Tribute albums
 Kami nAPO muna (2006)
 Kami nAPO muna ulit (2007)
 Kami nAPO Naman Dito Sa Canada (2009)
 Noel Cabangon "Throwback: Ang Songbuk ng APO" (2014)

Songs
 "American Junk" (covered by Kamikazee feat. Parokya Ni Edgar)
 "Anna" (covered by Top Suzara)
 "Ang Nobya Kong Sexy" (original composed by Jose Mari Chan & also the same theme song of a comedy movie film title, 1975)
 "Awit ng Barkada" (covered by Itchyworms, now covered by Noel Cabangon)
 "Bakit ang Babae" (1976, re released in 1991 for The Best Of APO Compilation Album, covered by Sandwich)
 "Banal Na Aso, Santong Kabayo" (original by Yano)
 "Batang-Bata Ka Pa" (covered by Sugarfree, now covered by Noel Cabangon)
 "Bawat Bata" (covered by The Dawn, also used by Sugarfree as a jingle ad for AlactaGrow)
 "Blue Jeans" (covered by Wise Guys, then Eraserheads, and then by Rocksteddy)
 "Dito Sa Kanto" (a song finalists at the 1999 Metropop Song Festival, originally composed by Noel Cabangon, covered by Noel Cabangon & re-recorded by Noel Cabangon Feat. Chito Miranda)
 "Di na Natuto" (1987) (original by Gary Valenciano, originally composed by Danny Javier & covered by APO, then Sound, and then by Noel Cabangon)
 "Doo Bi Doo" (covered by Kamikazee, now covered by Ogie Alcasid was used in a soundtrack I Doo Bidoo Bidoo)
 "Ewan" (a song won as 2nd place at the 1978 Metropop Song Festival, covered by Imago, now covered by Daniel Padilla)
 "Hanggang May Pag-Ibig" (covered by Chilitees)
 "Harana" (written by Eric Yaptangco, originally done by Tony Lambino, covered by Parokya Ni Edgar, also covered by Regine Velasquez, and now covered by The Company)
 "Heto Na" (covered by Concrete Sam)
 "Isang Dangkal" (covered by Paramita)
 "Just a Smile Away" (original by Jaime Gatchitorena, originally composed by Danny Javier & covered by APO, and then by Shamrock, now covered by MYMP)
 "Kabilugan ng Buwan" (covered by Drip, now covered by Noel Cabangon)
 "Kaibigan" (covered by Up Dharma Down, now covered by Noel Cabangon)
 "Kisapmata" (original by Rivermaya, covered by Yasmien Kurdi, Charice Pempengco (now Jake Zyrus) and by Daniel Padilla)
 "Kumot at Unan" (covered by Boldstar Band, and then by Richard Poon, now covered by Noel Cabangon)
 "Love Is for Singing" (covered by The Bloomfields)
 "Lumang Tugtugin" (now covered by Noel Cabangon)
 "Magasin" (original by Eraserheads, covered by Paolo Santos then by Yeng Constantino, now covered by Chicosci)
 "Magkikita Rin Tayo"
 "Mamang Kutsero" (Original by National Artist Ryan Cayabyab)
 "Mahirap Magmahal ng Syota ng Iba" (covered by Hilera, then by KZ Tandingan now covered by Yeng Constantino)
 "Minamahal Kong Pilipinas"
 "Nakapagtataka" (original by Hadji Alejandro, then covered by Susan Fuentes, then by Rachel Alejandro, and then by MYMP and by Sponge Cola, and now covered by Noel Cabangon)
 "Paano" (covered by Shamrock, now covered by Gary Valenciano used in a movie soundtrack I Do Bidoo Bidoo)
 "Pag-Ibig" (covered by Kitchie Nadal, then by Noel Cabangon, also used by Regine Velasquez as a jingle ad for Nestlé, now covered by Noel Cabangon)
 "Paglisan (original by Color It Red)
 "Pagsubok" (original by Orient Pearl, now covered by Aiza Seguerra)
 "Panalangin" (covered by Moonstar88, then by Richard Poon, then by Daniel Padilla, now covered by Noel Cabangon)
 "Pare Ko" (original by Eraserheads, covered by Sponge Cola, now covered by Johnoy Danao)
 "Prinsesa" (covered by Itchyworms)
 "Pumapatak ang Ulan" (covered by Eraserheads, then by Parokya Ni Edgar, now covered by Noel Cabangon)
 "Saan Na Nga Ba'ng Barkada" (covered by Sponge Cola)
 "Salawikain" (covered by Mcoy Fundales feat. Spaceflower Show)
 "Sasaya Ang Pilipinas" (covered by Various Artists including Edgar Allan Guzman, Vin Abrenica, CJ Reyes and Luigi Yotoko)
 "Show Me a Smile" (1976, covered by Imago, now covered by Noel Cabangon, TNT Boys and Sharon Cuneta)
 "Softly" (Debut single in 1975, re-released in 1991 for "The Best Of APO Vol. 2)
 "Suntok sa Buwan" (covered by Ely Buendia, then by Scrambled Eggs)
 "Syotang Pa-Class" (covered by Radioactive Sago Project)
 "Tuloy ang Ikot ng Mundo" (covered by Dicta License)
 "Tuyo Na'ng Damdamin" (covered by Eraserheads, then by Silent Sanctuary, now covered by Noel Cabangon)
 "Wala Nang Hahanapin Pa" (covered by True Faith)
 "When I Met You" (covered by Jeffrey Hidalgo, then by Martin Nievera, then by Barbie Almalbis, and then by KC Concepcion for the movie of the same name)
 "Yakap Sa Dilim" (covered by Rico J. Puno, then by Orange & Lemons, then by Brownman Revival, now covered by Noel Cabangon)

Original Christmas songs
 "12 Days of Pinoy Christmas" (the Filipino version of the Christmas song 12 Days of Christmas)
 "Ang Pasko"
 "Himig Ng Pasko (original by The New Minstrels)
 "Lata Ang Aming Tambol"
 "Pasko Na Sinta Ko/Miss Kita Kung Christmas (originally song by Gary Valenciano and The Lightnings Band & also covered by the late Susan Fuentes)
 "Tuloy na Tuloy Pa Rin ang Pasko (covered by Orange & Lemons for the 2006 ABS-CBN Christmas Station ID, and Ben&Ben in 2021)
 "Pasko Na Sa Mundo"

Filmography

Films of APO
 "Si Popeye ATBP" (Sine Pilipino Productions, 1973)
 "Kung Mangarap Ka't Magising" (LVN Pictures, 1977; Digitally Restored & Re-released by Star Cinema in 2016)
 "Kakabakaba Ka Ba?" (LVN Pictures, 1980; Digitally Restored & Re-released by Star Cinema in 2015)
 "Blue Jeans" (Regal Entertainment, 1981)
 "I Do Bidoo Bidoo" (Studio 5 Productions, 2012)

Television Shows of APO
 Noontime Matinee (GMA 7, 1972–1975)
 Ariel Con Tina (GMA 7, 1972–1974) -  guest performers
 Okay Lang (IBC 13, 1973-?) - Casts
 Seeing Stars With Joe Quirino (IBC 13, 1975–1980)
 Penthouse Seven (GMA 7, 1976–1979)
 GMA Supershow "Formerly Germside" (GMA 7, 1978–1982)
 Discorama (GMA 7, 1980–1986)- Host
 Champoy (RPN 9, 1980–1985) - guest
 Student Canteen (GMA 7, 1981–1986)- Host
 Penthouse Live! (GMA 7, 1984–1986) - guests performers
 Superstar (RPN 9, 1984–1995) - Guest
 Saturday Entertainment (GMA 7, 1986–1995) - guest performer
 Lunch Date (GMA 7, 1986–1993) - guest performer
 Vilma On Seven (GMA 7, 1987 – 1995) - Guest Performer
 Ryan Ryan Musikahan (ABS-CBN, 1988–1995) - guest performers
 Sa Linggo nAPO Sila (ABS-CBN, 1989–1995) - Host
 Eat Bulaga! (ABS-CBN, 1990) - Guest Performer with Tito, Vic, and Joey
 Salo Salo Together (GMA 7, 1993–1995)
 Eezy Dancing (TV5, 1993–1998)
 Sang Linggo nAPO Sila (ABS-CBN, 1995–1998) - Host
 A Little Night Of Music (GMA 7, 1995–1999) - guest performers
 ASAP Natin To "Formerly ASAP" (ABS-CBN, 1995–present) - guest
 Home Along Da Riles (ABS-CBN, 1995) - guest
 Palibhasa Lalake (ABS-CBN, 1995) - Guests as aliens from outer space
 Sang Linggo nAPO Sila (ABS-CBN, 1995–1998) - Host
 SOP: Sobrang Okay Pare (GMA 7, 1997–2010) - guest performers
 MYX Live (MYX Channel, 2000–2010, 2020) - guest performers
 MTB: Ang Saya Saya! (ABS-CBN, 2003–2005)
 Wowowee (ABS-CBN, 2005–2010) - guest performers
 Shall We Dance (TV5, 2005–2013) - guest performers
 Ang Pinaka (GMA News TV 27, 2005–2020) - cameo guest footage
 Bubble Gang (GMA 7, 2005–2010) - guests
 Wowowillie (TV5, 2010–2011) - guests performers
 Party Pilipinas (GMA 7, 2010–2013) - guest performers
 Wiltime Bigtime (TV5, 2011–2013) - guest performers
 Its Showtime (ABS-CBN 2, 2012–present) - guest performers
 Tonight With Arnold Clavio (GMA News TV 27 "now GTV 27", 2012–2017) - guest
 Mars (GMA News TV 27 "now ¹1, 2012–2019) - guest
 The Ryza Mae Show (GMA 7, 2012–2015) - guest
 Sunday All Stars (GMA 7, 2013–2015) - guest performers
 Gandang Gabi Vice (ABS-CBN 2, 2014) - guest
 Tonight With Boy Abunda (ABS-CBN, 2015–2020)
 Sabado Badoo (GMA 7, 2015) - Cameo Footage Featured
 Wowowin (GMA 7, 2015–present) - guest performers
 Sunday PinaSaya (GMA 7, 2015–2019) - guest performers
 Magandang Buhay (ABS-CBN 2, 2017) - guest
 Studio 7 (GMA 7, 2018–2019) - guest performers
 MARS Pa More (GMA 7, 2019–2022) - guest (July 8, 2019)
 All Out Sundays (GMA 7, 2020) - guest performers
 Letters & Music (NET 25, 2020–present) - guest performers
 Happy Time (NET 25, 2020–2021) - guest performers
 Sunday Noontime Live (TV5, 2020–2021) - guest performers
 Your Face Sounds Familiar Philippines Season 3 (Kapamilya Channel & A2Z 11, 2021) - special cameo footage

APO TV Specials
 UAAP Opening Ceremonies TV Special (RPN 9, 1975–1995; Studio 23 "now ABS-CBN Sports & Action Channel", 1996–2020)
 Discorama Anniversary Special (GMA 7, 1976–1978)
 GMA Supershow Anniversary Special (GMA 7, 1978–1988)
 PBA @ 10 Opening Ceremonies (RPN 9, 1985)
 PBA @ 15 Opening Ceremonies (PTV 4, 1990)
 ABS-CBN @ 40: ABS-CBN 2's 40th Anniversary TV Special (ABS-CBN 2, 1993)
 PBA @ 20 Opening Ceremonies (IBC 13, 1995)
 MBA Opening Ceremonies (ABS-CBN 2 & Studio 23 "now ABS-CBN Sports & Action Channel", 1998–2001)
 Homecoming Sa 13: Isang Pasasalamat (IBC 13, 1998)
 PBA @ 25 Opening Ceremonies (IBC 13, 2000)
 GMA Gold: The GMA 7's 50th Anniversary TV Special (GMA 7, 2000)
 ABS-CBN @ 50: The ABS-CBN 2's 50th Anniversary TV Special (ABS-CBN 2, 2003)
 PBA @ 30 Opening Ceremonies (RPN 9, 2005)
 Number 1 @ 55: The GMA 7's 55th Anniversary TV Special (GMA 7, 2005)
 ABS-CBN @ 55: The ABS-CBN 2's 55th Anniversary TV Special (ABS-CBN 2, 2008
 PBA @ 35 Opening Ceremonies (9TV, 2010)
 GMA @ 60: The Heart Of Television TV Special (GMA 7, 2010)
 PBA @ 40 Opening Ceremonies (TV5 & One Sports Channel, 2015)
 Thank You Kapuso: GMA 7 @ 65th Anniversary TV Special (GMA 7, 2015)
 MBPL Season 3 Opening Ceremonies (ABS-CBN Sports & Action 23, 2017)
 GMA @ 70: GMA 70th Anniversary Virtual TV Special (GMA 7, 2020)
 Shopee 11 TV Special (GMA 7, 2020)
 Lazada Supershow TV Special (GMA 7, 2021)

Awards and nominations
 Lifetime Achievement Award, Awit Awards
 Finalists, Metro Pop Song Festival 2001
 Celebrity Inductee Winner, Eastwood City Walk Of Fame, 2009
 2nd Place Winner, Metro Manila Popular Song Festival (now Metropop Song Festival) 1979
 Nominated, Best Male TV Hosts "Sa Linggo NAPO Sila," PMPC Star Awards For TV 1989-1995
 Nominated, Best Male TV Hosts "Sang Linggo NAPO Sila," PMPC Star Awards For TV 1995-1998

References

External links
 Jim Paredes's Blog
 Apo Hiking Society- Main Chat Transcript (Sep 21, 1999)
 
 

Filipino boy bands
Filipino folk music groups
Manila sound groups
Musical groups established in 1969
Musical groups disestablished in 2010
Filipino pop music groups
Musical groups from Quezon City
Vicor Music artists
1969 establishments in the Philippines
2010 disestablishments in the Philippines